İbrahim Hilmi Senil (1903–1981) was a Turkish judge. He was president of the Constitutional Court of Turkey from July 8, 1966 until July 14, 1968.

References

External links
Web-site of the Constitutional Court of Turkey 

Turkish judges
Turkish civil servants
1903 births
1981 deaths
Presidents of the Constitutional Court of Turkey
Istanbul University Faculty of Law alumni